Alec Hanley Bemis is a writer and manager of cultural projects who lives in Brooklyn, New York.

History
In 2001, Bemis co-founded Brassland with Aaron Dessner and Bryce Dessner who are known for their prominent role in American independent music (i.e. performing roles in The National and Clogs, and curatorial roles in the Dark Was the Night compilation and MusicNOW Festival). Brassland was initially created as a vehicle to release the debut recordings by The National and Clogs. Today it documents the work of an international community of musicians surrounding The National.

The Guardian newspaper called it "the record label at the centre of New York's other music scene" and "a focus for some of the city's most intriguing and creative musicians." Current signings include Buke and Gase, Hannah Georgas, Bartees Strange and Fusilier. It has previously released key projects by This Is The Kit, Clogs, Doveman, The Gloaming, Jherek Bischoff, Nico Muhly, Steven Reker's People Get Ready and Erik Friedlander.

Bemis has also worked as a manager and consultant with artists including Alexi Murdoch, !!!, Dirty Projectors, and The Barr Brothers, entities such as All Tomorrow's Parties and Cantaloupe Music, and performing arts institutions including Australia's Adelaide Festival, Ireland's National Concert Hall, and Greece's Stavros Niarchos Foundation. He has served on the board of directors for both WYBC and Manhattan New Music Project, a non-profit that sends musicians to teach in New York City schools.

He frequently emphasizes the importance of collaboration in creating music and culture, stating that Brassland was created to "foster the growth of the bands and the community around them.")

Previous to starting the label Bemis had an active career as a writer. In the 1990s, he published Jaboni Youth fanzine, focusing on the nascent American independent music scene. In the early 2000s he worked as a journalist for LA Weekly, The New York Times, The New Yorker and the Los Angeles Times. Since the mid-2000s his writing has primarily appeared on personal social network sites and occasionally blogs such as Arcade, a humanities site published by Stanford University. From 2012 to 2016, he hosted a radio show webcast by Alanna Heiss's Clocktower Productions. In autumn 2020, an article he wrote for The Creative Independent was widely disseminated on the internet. Called 19 things I’d tell people contemplating starting a record label (after running one for 19 years) it was a mix of advice, warnings, and personal history gleaned from almost two decades of operating Brassland. It was followed by an appearance on the Third Story podcast.

Discography (as Executive Producer)

Brassland albums 

 Baby Dayliner - High Heart & Low Estate
 Baby Dayliner - Critics Pass Away
 Buke & Gass - Riposte
 Clogs - Thom's Night Out
 Clogs - Lullaby for Sue
 Clogs - Stick Music
 Clogs - Lantern
 Clogs - Veil Waltz EP
 Clogs - The Creatures in the Garden of Lady Walton
 Clogs - Last Song EP
 Devastations - Devastations
 Devastations - Coal
 Doveman - With My Left Hand I Raise the Dead
 Doveman - Footloose
 Doveman - The Conformist
 Erik Friedlander - Maldoror
 The National - The National 
 The National - Sad Songs for Dirty Lovers
 The National - Cherry Tree
 Pela - All In Time EP

Cantaloupe Music albums 

 Alarm Will Sound - Michael Gordon: Van Gogh
 Bang on a Can All-Stars - Brian Eno: Music for Airports (Live)
 Burkina Electric - Paspanga
 Arnold Dreyblatt - Resonant Relations
 Florent Ghys - Baroque Tardif: Soli
 Michael Gordon - [purgatorio] POPOPERA
 Michael Harrison - Revelation: Music in Pure Intonation
 Phil Kline - John the Revelator
 David Lang - Music From the Film (Untitled)
 Lisa Moore - Seven: Music by Don Byron
 Tristan Perich - 1-Bit Music
 Sentieri Selvaggi - Plays Gavin Bryars & Philip Glass
 Julia Wolfe - Dark Full Ride: Music in Multiples

Other projects 

 Ian Axel - This is the New Year
 Alexi Murdoch - Towards the Sun

References

External links
Brassland
AlecHanleyBemis.com (writing archive site)
Alec Hanley Bemis's blog
A series of video interviews at InFrame.TV
A series of video interviews at Artists House Music

Living people
Writers from Brooklyn
Year of birth missing (living people)
Record producers from New York (state)